George Blount may refer to:

George Blount (died 1581) (1513–1581), MP
George Blount, 2nd Earl of Newport (died 1675)
Sir George Blount, 2nd Baronet (died 1667) of the Blount baronets

See also
Blount (surname)